Tiruray or Teduray is an Austronesian language of the southern Philippines. Tiruray is spoken in Datu Blah T. Sinsuat, Upi, the South Upi municipalities, southwestern Former Maguindanao Province, Lebak municipality, and northwestern Sultan Kudarat Province.

History 
In 1892, P. Guillermo Bennásar published a Spanish–Tiruray dictionary.

Phonology 
Two features set the Tiruray language apart from other Austronesian languages of the area. The first is a six-vowel system, and the second is the lack of a bilabial stop, but the presence of a bilabial fricative in its place.

Consonants

Vowels 
The Tiruray language has six vowel phonemes. These are split into three categories: front vowels, middle vowels, and back vowels. 

Syllables 
Tiruray does not allow vowel sequences. The syllable structure is CVC or CV. The majority of word bases in Tiruray have two syllables, but stems may have from one to five syllables. Adding affixes, a word can consist of as many as eight syllables.

There is no restriction on consonants used in a word as long as the word follows the CVC or CV structure. However, the letters  and  never follow after , and the same rule applies to  after .

Stress 
The primary word stress is placed on the ante-penultimate (third from the last syllable) or the penultimate (second to the last syllable) of a word with four syllables or more. Secondary stress is present on polysyllabic words, preceding the primary stress by two syllables. Stress is non-contrastive and non-phonetic.

Morphology

Nouns 
Singular nouns are followed by é and plural nouns are preceded by de instead. This is exemplified below:

Verbs 
The Tiruray verbs consist of an affix and verb base. Verbs are split into three categories numbered 1, 2, and 3.

Verbs that are accepted in a case frame having an objective actant are classed as verb 1.  An example of this is the following:

Verbs of type Verb 2 do not require an objective actant in the case frame. An example of Verb 2 is the following:

Verb 3 refers to the verbs that accept affixes and are verbalized. Verb 3 is divided into Verb 3a and 3b. Verb 3a are those verbalized nouns that do not need any agent actant. Examples of such nouns are  'rain' and  'earthquake'. Verbs that accept affirmation aside from those mentioned above are Verb 3b, and they can occur with actants. Examples of the type Verb 3 are  'painted', derived from the noun root  'paint', and  'ironing', derived from the noun root  'flat iron'.

Actant 
An actant is any constituent which can enter a case relationship with the verb. Tiruray distinguishes six types of actants: agent, object, dative, benefactive, instrument, and locative.

Agent 
The agent is the source responsible for the action identified by the verb or the perceived instigator of the action identified by the verb.

Object 
The object refers to the things or persons affected by the action or state identified by the verb.

Benefactive 
This is the case of the animate being for whom an action chosen by the verb is carried out, or the case of the animate being for whom an object specified in the proposition is intended or reserved.

Locative 
The locative indicates the spatial orientation of the action or state identified by the verb.

Dative 
This is the case of the animate being directly affected by the action or the state identified by the verb.

Instrument 
This marks the actant which expresses the object or being which is used as an instrument or means in carrying out the action or state identified by the verb.

Syntax

Word order 
In the basic word order the predicate followed by the series of NPs. The agentive or objective actant follows immediately after the predicate. When the agent is the topic, the agentive and objective actants may be changed without causing any semantic change.

Both of these forms are grammatical provided this sentence and subject matter. In all other cases, any topicalized actant follows the agent.

Loanwords 
The Tiruray people have adopted words from different places and though not all have been confirmed, according to the Tiruray speakers themselves the sources of the loans are Chinese, English, Hiligaynon, Maguindanao, Spanish, and Tagalog. These are the confirmed languages as given by the opinions of the Tiruray speakers. One language not listed as a source is Sanskrit, but suggested lexical items are perceived as native words by the speakers. Although some words are also borrowed from Arabic, these entered through Maguindanao.

References

Further reading 

 
 
 
 . Print.
 

Languages of Cotabato
Languages of Sultan Kudarat
South Mindanao languages